Kawagishi (written: 川岸) is a Japanese surname. Notable people with the surname include:

, Imperial Japanese Army general
, Japanese golfer
, Japanese baseball player
, Japanese footballer

See also
, a train station in Okaya City, Nagano Prefecture, Japan

Japanese-language surnames